Playa de las Américas is a purpose-built holiday resort in Tenerife, one of the Canary Islands of Spain. It is located in the southern and southern-west part of the Municipality of Arona, close to the adjoining Municipality of Adeje in the west of Tenerife. It was built in the 1960s a few miles distant from the fishing village of Los Cristianos. Playa de las Americas now (2021) is part of the contiguous touristic construction zone lining Tenerife's entire southwestern coast. The resort area features bars, nightclubs, restaurants, attractions, and beaches, most of which are man-made with imported sand from Africa due to the darkness of the native volcanic sand. 
Playa de las Americas is a centre of nightlife in Tenerife. Nightlife is spread around the resort and includes the Veronicas Strip, Starco Commercial Centre and the Patch.

Places of interest

Beaches
There are five main beaches.

Playa de El Bobo
This beach is found at the foot of H10 Gran Tinerfe hotel. This is the northernmost beach of Playa de las Américas.

Playa de Troya
Protected by breakwaters, Playa de Troya beach allows for fun in the water without high waves. This beach is located near Ravine of Troy.

Playa de las Américas
Playa de las Américas is an exposed beach and reef break that has reliable surf, although summer tends to be mostly flat.

Playa Honda
Melocactuses grow on the flower beds near Playa Honda beach.

Playa del Camisón
Playa del Camisón is the southernmost beach of Playa de las Américas.

Central Park of Arona 
The Central Park of Arona, or Parque Central de Arona, is a public park of 42,000 square metres. It has several squares, playgrounds and parking areas and a collection of tropical and Canarian plants.

It is located in the centre of Playa de las Americas beside the football stadium. It is bordered by colleges, court, a hospital, and residential buildings.

References

External links

 Arona.org General information site in English and Spanish
 Playa de las Américas -beaches World Travel Guide

Populated places in Tenerife
Seaside resorts in Spain
1960s establishments in the Canary Islands